The 1992–93 Algerian Championnat National was the 31st season of the Algerian Championnat National since its establishment in 1962. A total of 16 teams contested the league, with MC Oran as the defending champions, The Championnat started on october 26, 1992. and ended on october 21, 1993.

Team summaries

Promotion and relegation 
Teams promoted from Algerian Division 2 1992-1993 
 WA Boufarik
 CA Batna
 USM Bel-Abbès

Teams relegated to Algerian Division 2 1993-1994
 USM Annaba
 ASM Oran
 MO Constantine

League table

Season statistics

Top scorers

8 goals : Zouani (USMB), Benyahia (WAT), Bernahou (WAM).
7 goals : Hedibel et Benmessahel (MCA), Neggazi (CRB), Boutaleb et Rahem (USMH), Alloui (ASAM), Kaoua (USC), Goul et Belatoui (MCO).
6 goals : Moussouni (CRB), Dziri (NAHD), Sid (USC).
5 goals : Adjali (NAHD),  Ziret (ESS), Benzerga (ASMO), Issolah et Rahmouni et Djahmoun (JSBM), Abbad et Bentis et Haidour (WAM).
4 goals : Gouli (MCA), Kamel Kaci-Saïd et Meguenni (USMB), Khiat (USC), Kabrane (CRB), Amirou (JSK), Yahi (USC), Taguine (USMH), Heddadi (JSBM), Heddada (ASMO), Idirem (NAHD), Boukheddane (MOC), Djalti (WAT), Mehdaoui (ESS).

References

Algerian Championnat National
Championnat National
Algerian Ligue Professionnelle 1 seasons